Myles is a Germanic and English given name meaning "peaceful".

Notable people with the name include

A
Myles Adams (born 1998), American football player
Myles Allen, English scientist
Myles Ambrose (1926–2014), American lawyer
Myles Amine (born 1996), Sammarinese-American wrestler
Myles Anderson (born 1990), English footballer
Myles Arkell (born 1932), English cricketer

B
Myles Baldwin (born 1978), Australian landscape designer
Myles Beerman (born 1999), Maltese footballer
Myles Boddington (1924–2002), English cricketer
Myles Boney (born 1998), English footballer
Myles Brand (1942–2009), American academic administrator
Myles Brennan (born 1999), American football player
Myles Bright (born 2002), English footballer
Myles Brown (born 1992), South African swimmer
Myles A. Brown, American oncologist
Myles Brundidge (born 1960), American curler
Myles Bryant (born 1998), American football player
Myles Burnyeat (1939–2019), English philosopher
Myles Byrne (1780–1862), Irish rebel leader

C
Myles Cale (born 1999), American basketball player
Myles Chefetz (born 1958), American restaurateur
Myles Connolly (1897–1964), American author
Myles Conte (1947–2014), South African cricketer
Myles Cooper (1735–1785), English priest
Myles Cornwall (born 1988), Canadian footballer
Myles Coverdale (1488–1569), English translator

D
Myles Davies (1662–1715/1716), Welsh author
Myles Deering (born 1953), American general
Myles de Vries (born 1940), English cricketer
Myles Dillon (1900–1972), Irish historian
Myles Dorn (born 1998), American football player
Myles Dorrian (born 1982), Australian rugby union player
Myles Dungan (born 1954), Irish broadcaster
Myles P. Dyer (1887–1969), American politician

E
Myles Eason (1915–1977), Australian actor
Myles Edwards (born 1997), English rugby union footballer
Myles Erlick (born 1998), Canadian actor
Myles D. Evans (1901–1982), American football player and coach

F
Myles Ferguson (1981–2000), Canadian actor
Myles Ferricks (1875–1932), Australian politician
Myles Birket Foster (1825–1899), English illustrator
Myles Frechette (1936–2017), American ambassador
Myles Frost (born 1999), American actor
Myles Fukunaga (1909–1929), Japanese-American criminal

G
Myles Gal (born 2000), Greek rugby league footballer
Myles Garrett (born 1995), American football player
Myles Gaskin (born 1997), American football player
Myles Goodwyn (born 1948), Canadian guitarist

H
Myles Hartsfield (born 1997), American football player
Myles Hesson (born 1990), British basketball player
Myles Thoroton Hildyard (1914–2005), English historian
Myles Hippolyte (born 1994), English footballer
Myles Hogarth (born 1975), Scottish footballer
Myles Hollander (born 1941), American statistician
Myles Horton (1905–1990), American educator
Myles Humphreys (1925–1998), Northern Irish politician

J
Myles Jack (born 1995), American football player
Myles Jackman (born 1974/1975), English lawyer
Myles Jackson (born 1964), American history professor
Myles Jaye (born 1991), American baseball player
Myles Johnson (born 1999), American basketball player
Myles Jones (born 1993), American lacrosse player
Myles Judd (born 1999), English footballer
Myles Jury (born 1988), American mixed martial artist

K
Myles Kenlock (born 1996), English footballer
Myles Kennedy (born 1969), American musician
Myles Kenyon (1886–1960), English cricketer
Myles Keogh (1840–1876), Irish soldier
Myles Keogh (Irish politician) (??–1952), Irish politician
Myles Kovacs, American entrepreneur

L
Myles Landick (born 1989), English rugby union player
Myles Lane (1903–1987), American ice hockey player
Myles Lee (born 1953), Irish businessman
Myles Little, American photographer
Myles Loftin (born 1998), American photographer
Myles Archibald Lyons (1824–1899), Australian police officer

M
Myles Mace (1911–2000), American professor
Myles Mack (born 1993), American basketball player
Myles Martel (born 1943), American communication advisor
Myles Martin (born 1996), American wrestler
Myles McDonagh (1905–??), Irish boxer
Myles McKeon (1919–2016), Irish-Australian bishop
Myles McRae (1845–1926), Australian politician
Myles McSweeney (1814–1881), Irish writer
Myles Miller, American reporter
Myles Morin (born 1954), Canadian political figure
Myles Moylan (1838–1909), American army officer
Myles Munroe (1954–2014), Bahamian evangelist
Myles Murphy (disambiguation), multiple people
Myles Murray (1906–1985), Canadian politician

O
Myles O'Connor (born 1967), Canadian ice hockey player
Myles P. O'Connor, American football player
Myles O'Donnell (??–1933), Irish-American bootlegger
Myles O'Reilly (disambiguation), multiple people

P
Myles Patrick (born 1954), American basketball player
Myles Peart-Harris (born 2002), English footballer
Myles Pillage (born 1998), British pentathlete
Myles Poholke (born 1998), Australian rules footballer
Myles Pollard (born 1972), Australian actor
Myles Ponsonby (1924–1999), British soldier
Myles Porter (born 1985), American judoka
Myles Powell (born 1997), American basketball player
Myles Pritchard (born 1958), Bahamian sailor

R
Myles Rockwell (born 1972), American mountain biker
Myles Rowe (born 2000), American racing driver
Myles Rudge (1926–2007), English songwriter

S
Myles W. Scoggins, American academic administrator
Myles Shevlin (??–1990), Irish politician
Myles Standish (1584–1656), English military officer
Myles Staunton (1935–2011), Irish politician and businessman
Myles Stephens (born 1997), American basketball player
Myles Stoddard (born 1977), American soccer player

T
Myles Thomas (1897–1963), American baseball player
Myles Tierney (1937–2017), American mathematician
Myles Truitt (born 2002), American actor
Myles Turner (born 1996), American basketball player
Myles Turner (park warden) (1921–1984), Tanzanian park warden

W
Myles Wakefield (born 1974), South African tennis player
Myles Weston (born 1988), Antiguan footballer
Myles White (born 1990), American football player
Myles Wilder (1933–2010), American television producer
Myles Wright (born 1996), English footballer

See also
Myles (surname), a page for people with the surname "Myles"
Miles (given name)
Mile (disambiguation), a disambiguation page for "Mile"

Other

Masculine given names